Rino Iuliano (born 10 March 1984) is an Italian football player who plays for Casarano.

Club career
He made his professional debut in the Serie B for Salernitana on 2 April 2010 in a game against Reggina.

References

External links
 

1984 births
Sportspeople from the Province of Salerno
Living people
Italian footballers
Potenza S.C. players
U.S. Salernitana 1919 players
Serie B players
A.C.R. Messina players
Serie C players
A.C. Prato players
U.S. Avellino 1912 players
S.S. Ischia Isolaverde players
Association football goalkeepers
Footballers from Campania